The 1927 Idaho Vandals football team represented the University of Idaho in the 1927 college football season. The Vandals were led by second-year head coach Charles F. Erb and were members of the Pacific Coast Conference. Home games were played on campus in Moscow 

Idaho compiled a 4–1–3 overall record and went undefeated in their four conference games  They did not play the three California schools (Stanford, California, and USC) or Washington. (UCLA joined the conference the following year.)

In the Battle of the Palouse with neighbor Washington State, the Vandals tied 7–7 at Rogers Field in Pullman on Friday,  The Cougars broke the Vandals' three-game winning streak  in the rivalry game the previous year.

The only loss was to Gonzaga in the finale; the Bulldogs won 13–0 at Gonzaga Stadium in Spokane on

Conference co-champions
This season is claimed by Idaho as a co-championship with Stanford  and was supported at the time by the Pacific Coast Conference following its December 1927 meetings  Stanford gained the Rose Bowl berth and defeated Pittsburgh  on Monday,  The three co-champions were granted possession of the Schwabacher Trophy for four

Schedule

 The Little Brown Stein trophy for the Montana game debuted eleven years later in 1938
 The Battle of the Palouse at Washington State was played on Friday (Armistice Day holiday)

References

External links
Gem of the Mountains: 1928 University of Idaho yearbook – 1927 football season 
 Go Mighty Vandals – 1927 football season
 Scout.com: Idaho – Idaho vs. USC – The 1920s Series (Part III) and Part IV
Official game program: Idaho at Washington State –  November 11, 1927
Idaho Argonaut – student newspaper – 1927 editions

Idaho
Idaho Vandals football seasons
Pac-12 Conference football champion seasons
Idaho Vandals football